Werner Theodor Otto Forßmann (Forssmann in English; ; 29 August 1904 – 1 June 1979) was a German researcher and physician from Germany who shared the 1956 Nobel Prize in Medicine (with Andre Frederic Cournand and Dickinson W. Richards) for developing a procedure that allowed cardiac catheterization. In 1929, he put himself under local anesthesia and inserted a catheter into a vein of his arm. Not knowing if the catheter might pierce a vein, he put his life at risk.  Forssmann was nevertheless successful; he safely passed the catheter into his heart.

Early life 
Forssmann was born in Berlin on 29 August 1904.

Career
He hypothesized that a catheter could be inserted directly into the heart, for such applications as directly delivering drugs, injecting radiopaque dyes, or measuring blood pressure. The fear at the time was that such an intrusion into the heart would be fatal. To prove his point, he decided to try the experiment on himself.

In 1929, while working in Eberswalde, he performed the first human cardiac catheterization. He ignored his department chief and persuaded the operating-room nurse in charge of the sterile supplies, Gerda Ditzen, to assist him. She agreed, but only on the promise that he would do it on her rather than on himself. However, Forssmann tricked her by restraining her to the operating table and pretending to locally anaesthetise and cut her arm whilst actually doing it on himself. He anesthetized his own lower arm in the cubital region and inserted a urinary catheter into his antecubital vein, threading it partly along before releasing Ditzen (who at this point realised the catheter was not in her arm) and telling her to call the X-ray department. They walked some distance to the X-ray department on the floor below where under the guidance of a fluoroscope he advanced the catheter the full 60 cm into his right ventricular cavity. This was then recorded on X-Ray film showing the catheter lying in his right atrium.

The head clinician at Eberswalde, although initially very annoyed, recognized Werner's discovery when shown the X-rays; he allowed Forssmann to carry out another catheterization on a terminally ill woman whose condition improved after being given drugs in this way. An unpaid position was created for Forssmann at the Berliner Charité Hospital, working under Ferdinand Sauerbruch, although once Sauerbruch saw his paper, he was dismissed for continuing without his approval. Sauerbruch commented, "You certainly can't begin surgery in that manner". Facing such disciplinary action for self-experimentation, he was initially forced to leave the Charité, but was later re-instated until again being forced to leave in 1932 for not meeting scientific expectations. His surgical skills were noted, however, and he was recommended to another hospital where he worked for a while before leaving in 1933 after marrying Dr. Elsbet Engel, a specialist in urology there. Finding it difficult to get a job with his reputation, he quit cardiology and took up urology.

From 1932 to 1945, he was a member of the Nazi Party. At the start of World War II, he became a medical officer. In the course of his service, he rose to the rank of Major, until he was captured and put into a U.S. POW camp. Upon his release in 1945, he worked as a lumberjack and then as a country medic in the Black Forest with his wife. In 1950, he began practice as a urologist in Bad Kreuznach.

During the time of his imprisonment, his paper was read by André Frédéric Cournand and Dickinson W. Richards. They developed ways of applying his technique to heart disease diagnosis and research. In 1954, he was given the Leibniz Medal of the German Academy of Sciences. In 1956, the Nobel Prize in Physiology or Medicine was awarded to Cournand, Richards, and Forßmann.

After winning the Nobel Prize, he was given the position of Honorary Professor of Surgery and Urology at the University of Mainz. In 1961, he became an honorary professor at the National University of Córdoba. In 1962, he became a member of the Executive Board of the German Society of Surgery.

Personal life
He and Elsbet had six children: Klaus Forßmann in 1934, Knut Forßmann in 1936, Jörg Forßmann in 1938, Wolf Forßmann in 1939 (who was first to isolate the atrial natriuretic peptide), Bernd Forßmann in 1940 (who helped develop the first clinical lithotriptor), and Renate Forßmann in 1943.

He died in Schopfheim, Germany of heart failure on 1 June 1979. His wife died in 1993.

See also 
 André Frédéric Cournand
 Andreas Gruentzig
 Dickinson W. Richards

Notes

References

External links 

Biographical Sketch of Werner Forßmann with video clip
The 'Man Who Touched His Own Heart'; NPR interview with Robert Dunn, his biographer
www.aerztezeitung.de: Der Herzkatheter-Selbstversuch: Dichtung und Wahrheit (in German)
Heart pioneers and the curious case of Werner Forssmann - British Heart Foundation Blog Article
  including the Nobel Lecture, December 11, 1956 The Role of Heart Catheterization and Angiocardiography in the Development of Modern Medicine

1904 births
1979 deaths
Physicians from Berlin
Physicians in the Nazi Party
Nobel laureates in Physiology or Medicine
German Nobel laureates
German prisoners of war in World War II held by the United States
Humboldt University of Berlin alumni
Grand Crosses with Star and Sash of the Order of Merit of the Federal Republic of Germany
Physicians of the Charité
Sturmabteilung officers